The 9th U-boat Flotilla (German 9. Unterseebootsflottille) was formed in October 1941 in Brest. It became operational in April 1942, after the first combat ready U-boat, reached the Brest base on 20 March 1942. The flotilla operated mostly various marks of the Type VII U-boat and it concentrated its efforts mainly in the North Atlantic, against convoys to and from Great Britain. The flotilla served from Brest until the base was threatened with being captured by American forces. The last of the flotilla's U-boats, the  left Brest on 4 September 1944 for Bergen, Norway, and this marked the end of the 9th Flotilla. All its surviving boats were reassigned to the 11th U-boat Flotilla in Bergen.

The symbol of the 9th Flotilla, Der lachende Schwertfisch or the "laughing Swordfish" became the unit symbol after Lehmann-Willenbrock assumed command. It has previously been the conning tower emblem on his previous command,  of "Das Boot" fame.

Flotilla commanders

U-boats of the Flotilla

References

09
Military units and formations of the Kriegsmarine
Military units and formations established in 1941
Military units and formations disestablished in 1945